Nicolás García Hemme (born 20 June 1988 in Las Palmas, Canary Islands) is a Spanish taekwondo athlete.

He won the silver medal in the men's welterweight (80 kg) division at the 2009 World Taekwondo Championships in Copenhagen. Three years later, he won the silver medal in men's welterweight (80 kg) division at the 2012 Summer Olympics in London.

See also
 List of Olympic medalists in taekwondo

External links
 Olympic profile london2012.com
 

1988 births
Spanish male taekwondo practitioners
Taekwondo practitioners at the 2012 Summer Olympics
Olympic taekwondo practitioners of Spain
Medalists at the 2012 Summer Olympics
Olympic medalists in taekwondo
Olympic silver medalists for Spain
Living people
Mediterranean Games bronze medalists for Spain
Mediterranean Games medalists in taekwondo
Competitors at the 2013 Mediterranean Games
European Taekwondo Championships medalists
World Taekwondo Championships medalists
20th-century Spanish people
21st-century Spanish people